Pseudohemiodon platycephalus is a species of armored catfish native to Argentina and Brazil, particularly in the Paraguay River basin.

References
 

Loricariini
Fish of South America
Fish of Argentina
Fish of Brazil
Taxa named by Rudolf Kner
Fish described in 1853